Road to the Big Leagues is a 2007 independent documentary film. This film follows children from the Dominican Republic who rely on baseball as a way out of poverty and struggle.

Festivals 
Independent Film Festival of Boston 2007 (Boston, United States)
Los Angeles Latino International Film Festival 2007 (Los Angeles, California)
New York Latino International Film Festival 2007 (New York, United States)

External links
http://www.elementproductions.com
http://www.indiepixfilms.com/
http://www.iffboston.org/
http://www.lafilmfest.com/2009/
http://nylatinofilm.com/index.html
http://www.indiepixfilms.com/film/3537#film_info
http://www.imdb.com/title/tt1372294/
http://www.indiepixfilms.com

2007 films
2007 documentary films
2000s sports films
Documentary films about children
Documentary films about baseball
Films set in the Dominican Republic
2000s Spanish-language films
American sports documentary films
2000s English-language films
2000s American films